Zechariah Shem (born 22 November 1994) is a Vanuatuan cricketer who plays for the Vanuatu cricket team. In March 2019, he was named in the Vanuatuan squad for the Regional Finals of the 2018–19 ICC T20 World Cup East Asia-Pacific Qualifier tournament. He made his Twenty20 International (T20I) debut for Vanuatu against the Philippines on 24 March 2019.

He is also a cricket umpire, and was one of the on-field umpires in the second match of the 2019 ICC Women's Qualifier EAP tournament, between Japan women and Indonesia women in Vanuatu. 

In June 2019, he was selected to represent the Vanuatu cricket team in the men's tournament at the 2019 Pacific Games. In September 2019, he was named in Vanuatu's squad for the 2019 Malaysia Cricket World Cup Challenge League A tournament. He made his List A debut for Vanuatu, against Singapore, in the Cricket World Cup Challenge League A tournament on 22 September 2019.

References

External links
 

1994 births
Living people
Vanuatuan cricketers
Vanuatu Twenty20 International cricketers
Vanuatuan cricket umpires
Place of birth missing (living people)